Monedero is a surname. Notable people with the surname include:

Ángel Lizcano Monedero (1846–1929), Spanish painter and illustrator
Juan Carlos Monedero (born 1963), Spanish political scientist and politician

Spanish-language surnames